Naci Erdem (28 January 1931 – 28 March 2022) was a Turkish footballer who played as a centre-back. He is Fenerbahçe's fifth most capped footballer, with 605 caps. 

He started his career with Fatih Karagümrük, and transferred from Havagücü in 1955.

Erdem played for Fenerbahçe between 1953–63. He was capped 605 times in Fenerbahçe history and scored 168 goals. He won four times Turkish League and once more with Galatasaray after being transferred there in 1964. He played 34 times for Turkey and he started as captain three times. Erdem played for Turkey at the 1954 FIFA World Cup.

References

1931 births
2022 deaths
Turkish footballers
Footballers from Istanbul
Association football central defenders
Turkey international footballers
1954 FIFA World Cup players
Süper Lig players
TFF First League players
Fatih Karagümrük S.K. footballers
Fenerbahçe S.K. footballers
Beyoğlu SK footballers
Galatasaray S.K. footballers
Edirnespor footballers
Turkish football managers